James O'Sullivan may refer to:

James O'Sullivan (bishop) (1834–1915), Irish Anglican bishop 
James O'Sullivan (defence storekeeper) (1855–1925), New Zealand Army Officer
James O'Sullivan (politician) (1867–1921), member of the Queensland Legislative Assembly 
Jimmie O'Sullivan (1883–1960), New Zealand rugby union player
James O'Sullivan (academic) (born 1986), Irish writer, publisher, and academic